Shaw is a locality in the City of Townsville, Queensland, Australia.

History 
Shaw is situated in the traditional Wulgurukaba Aboriginal country. The district was named on 27 July 1991.

St Benedict's Catholic School opened with 163 students in January 2018.

Education 
St Benedict's Catholic School is a Catholic primary (Prep-6) school at 890 Dalrymple Road.

References 

Suburbs of Townsville
Localities in Queensland